The 1969 Copa Argentina Finals were the final series that decided the champion of the 1969 Copa Argentina. The finals were contested in two-legged format between Boca Juniors and Atlanta. Both matches were played at San Lorenzo de Almagro's venue, Estadio Gasómetro, located in Buenos Aires. 

Boca Juniors won the first match 3–1, and Atlanta won the second match 1–0, but in the aggregate Boca Juniors won 32 to claim their first Copa Argentina Title. The champions was automatically qualified to the Copa Ganadores de Copa, but Boca had already qualified to 1970 Copa Libertadores, so the runners-up, Atlanta, took place in the competition.

Qualified teams

Venue

Road to the final

Match details

First leg

Second leg

Boca Juniors won 3–2 on goal difference

References

Copa Argentina
1969 in Argentine football
a
Football in Buenos Aires